Polia is a genus of moths of the family Noctuidae described by Ochsenheimer in 1816.

Species
 Polia adustaeoides Draeseke, 1928
 Polia albomixta Draudt, 1950
 Polia altaica (Lederer, 1853)
 Polia atrax Draudt, 1950
 Polia bombycina (Hufnagel, 1766) – pale shining brown
 Polia cherrug Rakosy & Wieser, 1997
 Polia conspicua (A. Bang-Haas 1912)
 Polia culta (Moore, 1881)
 Polia discalis (Grote, 1877)
 Polia enodata (Bang-Haas, 1912)
 Polia goliath (Oberthür, 1880)
 Polia griseifusa Draudt, 1950
 Polia hepatica (Clerck, 1759) – silvery arches
 Polia ignorata (Hreblay, 1996)
 Polia imbrifera (Guenée, 1852)
 Polia kalikotei (Varga, 1992)
 Polia lamuta (Hertz, 1903)
 Polia malchani (Draudt, 1934)
 Polia mortua (Staudinger, 1888)
 Polia nebulosa (Hufnagel, 1766) – grey arches
 Polia nimbosa (Guenée, 1852)
 Polia nugatis (Smith, 1898)
 Polia piniae Buckett & Bauer, [1967]
 Polia praecipua (Staudinger, 1898)
 Polia propodea McCabe, 1980
 Polia purpurissata (Grote, 1864)
 Polia richardsoni (Curtis, 1835)
 Polia richardsoni richardsoni (Curtis, 1834)
 Polia richardsoni magna (Barnes & Benjamin, 1924) 
 Polia rogenhoferi (Möschler, 1870) (syn: Polia leomegra (Smith, 1908), Polia carbonifera (Hampson, 1908))
 Polia scotochlora Kollar, 1844
 Polia serratilinea Ochsenheimer, 1816
 Polia similissima Plante, 1982
 Polia sublimis (Draudt, 1950)
 Polia subviolacea (Leech, 1900)
 Polia tiefi Püngeler, 1914
 Polia vespertilio (Draudt, 1934)
 Polia vesperugo Eversmann, 1856

Former species
 Polia delecta is now Orthodes delecta Barnes & McDunnough, 1916
 Polia detracta is now Orthodes detracta (Walker, 1857)
 Polia vauorbicularis is now Orthodes vauorbicularis (Smith, 1902)

References

Hadenini